Oliver Popović (born 18 March 1970) is a Serbian professional basketball coach and former player.

Playing career 
He was a Yugoslav champion (1987, 1989, and 1998) and Cup holder (1989), silver medalist of Russian (2002) and Greek (2004) basketball championships; bronze medalist of 1988 European Champions' Cup, winner of 1989 Korać Cup and 2003 NEBL; finalist of the 2004 FIBA Euroleague.

Coaching career 
On 7 August 2017, Popović was named a head coach of the Belgrade team Dynamic. On 19 December, he parted ways with Dynamic.

On 21 June 2018, Popović became the head coach for Novi Pazar of the Basketball League of Serbia. He left Novi Pazar after the 2019–20 season.

On 1 November 2020, Popović was hired as the new head coach for his hometown team Sloboda Užice.

On 19 November 2022, Popović became the head coach of UNICS Kazan youth team.

References

1970 births
Living people
BC UNICS players
KK Avala Ada coaches
KK Beobanka players
KK Borac Čačak players
KK Crvena zvezda players
KK Dynamic coaches
KK Mega Basket coaches
KK IMT Beograd players
KK Partizan players
KK Napredak Kruševac coaches
KK Tamiš coaches
KK Sloboda Užice coaches
KK Spartak Subotica players
KK Vršac coaches
KK Vizura coaches
OKK Novi Pazar coaches
Maroussi B.C. players
Serbian men's basketball coaches
Serbian men's basketball players
Sportspeople from Užice
Serbian expatriate basketball people in Russia
Serbian expatriate basketball people in Greece
Serbian expatriate basketball people in Ukraine
Serbian expatriate basketball people in Romania
Small forwards